Final supper may mean:

 Last Supper, Final meal that, in the Gospel accounts, Jesus shared with his apostles in Jerusalem before his crucifixion
 Last meal, Meal preceding an execution